"Act Right" is a song by American rapper Yo Gotti. The song was released on July 23, 2013, as the first single from his sixth studio album I Am. The song produced by HBK Gang member P-Lo, features American rappers Jeezy and YG. The song has peaked at number 100 on the US Billboard Hot 100.

Music video
On July 24, 2013, the music video for the track was released. It was directed by Alex Nazari.

Charts

Certifications

Release history

References

2013 songs
2013 singles
Yo Gotti songs
Jeezy songs
Songs written by Jeezy
YG (rapper) songs
Songs written by Yo Gotti
Songs written by Roger Troutman
Songs written by the Notorious B.I.G.
Songs written by Easy Mo Bee
Songs written by YG (rapper)